SVCE & SVCP Indore or SVGI Indore, is a Government college located in Madhya Pradesh, India. It was established in 2004 under the auspices of Swami Vivekanand Takniki Sansthan, Indore.

SVGI, which has carved a special place rich in the field of education around Indore is not only approved by All India Council for Technical Education (AICTE) New Delhi, the premier Central Regulatory Body but is also an affiliate to Rajiv Gandhi Proudyogiki Vishwavidyalaya, Bhopal and Devi Ahilya Vishwavidyalaya, Indore. It is duly recognized by the Directorate of Technical Education, Madhya Pradesh, spread over a scenic campus of over 25 acres land.

The institute offers six undergraduates and five postgraduate courses with an intake of 540 and 174 students respectively. At any time, there are approximately 2400 undergraduate students studying in the institute.

References

SVCE Official website
Gate official site 
AICTE official site

External links 
SVCE's Official website
RGTU
Vyapam

Education in Indore
Science and technology in Indore
Engineering colleges in Madhya Pradesh
Educational institutions established in 2004
Memorials to Swami Vivekananda
2004 establishments in Madhya Pradesh